The Mayor of San Salvador is the head of the municipal government of the city of San Salvador, the capital city of El Salvador.

History 

The position of Mayor of San Salvador was established on 1 April 1525 with Diego de Holguín, a Spanish conquistador, serving as its first mayor. He served as mayor of the old city of San Salvador, now known as Ciudad Vieja. The city was refounded in 1528 in its modern location and Diego de Alvarado assumed the mayorship of San Salvador.

List of mayors

Lieutenant Governors

Ordinary Mayors

Greater Mayors

Colonial Intendants

Modern Mayors

See also 

San Salvador

References

Bibliography

External links 

Alcalde de San Salvador, official website of the Mayor of San Salvador.

Mayors of San Salvador